Sacred Heart High School is a separate high school in Walkerton, Ontario, Canada. The school offers a French Immersion Program as well as a Specialist High Skills Major Program. Additionally the school offers an "innovation and manufacturing centre".

References

External links
Sacred Heart Catholic High School

High schools in Ontario
Schools in Bruce County
Educational institutions in Canada with year of establishment missing